The World of Yesterday: Memoires of a European (German title Die Welt von Gestern: Erinnerungen eines Europäers) is the memoir of Austrian writer Stefan Zweig. It has been called the most famous book on the Habsburg Empire. He started writing it in 1934 when, anticipating Anschluss and Nazi persecution, he uprooted himself from Austria to England and later to Brazil. He posted the manuscript, typed by his second wife Lotte Altmann, to the publisher the day before they both committed suicide in February 1942. The book was first published in Stockholm (1942), as Die Welt von Gestern. It was first published in English in April 1943 by Viking Press. In 2011, Plunkett Lake Press reissued it in eBook form. In 2013, the University of Nebraska Press published a translation by the noted British translator Anthea Bell.

The book describes life in Vienna at the start of the 20th century with detailed anecdotes. It depicts the dying days of Austria-Hungary under Emperor Franz Joseph I of Austria, including the system of education and the sexual ethics prevalent at the time, the same that provided the backdrop to the emergence of psychoanalysis. Zweig also describes the stability of Viennese society after centuries of Habsburg rule.

Chapters

Detailed summary

Preface 

Zweig sets out to write his autobiography following the terrible events and upheavals experienced by his generation. He feels the need to bear witness to the next generation of what his age has gone through. He realizes that his past is "out of reach." Zweig makes it clear that his biography is based entirely on his memories.

The world of security 

Zweig looks back on pre-war Austrian and especially Viennese society. "When I attempt to find a simple formula for the period in which I grew up, before the First World War, I hope that I convey its fullness by calling it the Golden Age of Security." Austria had a stable political system and a currency backed by gold, and everyone could see themselves comfortably into the future. Many inventions revolutionized lives: the telephone, electricity, and the car.

Originally from Moravia, his father made his fortune by running a small weaving factory. The author's mother comes from a wealthy Italian banking family, born in Ancona. His family represents the cosmopolitan "good Jewish bourgeoisie." Nevertheless, if the latter aspires to enrich themselves, this is not their purpose. The ultimate goal is to elevate oneself morally and spiritually. Also, it is the Jewish bourgeoisie that has primarily become a patron of Viennese culture. Vienna had become the city of culture, where culture was the primary concern. All Viennese had desirable tastes and were capable of making judgments of qualities. The artists, especially the theater actors, were Austria's only significant famous figures. Their concerns were trivialities given the events that followed, which were unthinkable.

At school in the 19th century 

His time in school was quite unpleasant. Sport had a minimal place, performed in a dusty gymnasium. Zweig bitterly criticizes the old way of impersonal, cold, and distant teaching.

In society, there was a certain distrust of young people. The author's father never hired young people, and the young tried to appear more mature, for example, by growing a beard. Respect for the elders was vital. Zweig even claims that the school's purpose was to discipline and calm the youth's ardor.

However, in the face of this pressure, the students harbored a deep hatred toward vertical authority. A turning point took place in their fortnight: school no longer satisfied their passion, which shifted to the art of which Vienna was the heart. All the pupils turned entirely to art: avid readers of literature and philosophy, listeners to concerts, spectators of plays, etc. The Viennese cafés played an essential role in the lives of these young students as a cultural center. Their passion gradually shifted away from the classics, and they became more interested in rising stars, especially young artists. A typical example of this aspiration is the case of Rainer Maria Rilke: a symbol of the whole movement of a victorious youth, completing the precocious genius Hugo von Hofmannsthal.

During this time, the first mass movements affected Austria, starting with the socialist movement, then the Christian Democratic Movement, and finally, the German Reich's unification movement. In addition, the anti-Semitic trend began to gain momentum, although it was still relatively moderate in its early stages.

Eros Matutinus 
In this chapter, Zweig relates the period of puberty, the transition to adulthood. Earlier European societies, where Christianity had a central role, condemned sexual impulses as diabolical. The late 19th century had abandoned these ideas but was left with no language to describe sexual impulses, which became unmentionable. They became a parallel world that could not be described, mostly prostitution. Venereal diseases were prevalent and horrifying. Young men abandoned the prudery of their elders as hypocritical.

According to Zweig, fashion contributed to this peculiar oppression by denying the female body and constraining it with corsets, distorting the female figure and breaking its grace. This concealment merely served to draw the thoughts to what was hidden. Young girls were guarded and occupied so that they could never think about sexuality.
Zweig notes that the situation has dramatically improved for both women and men, and the generation after him was much more fortunate. Women are now much freer, and men are no longer forced to live their sexuality in the shadows.

Universitas vitae 
Zweig recounts his transition to university. At this time, the university was crowned with a particular glory inherited from ancient privileges linked to its creation in the Middle Ages. According to Zweig, the ideal student was a scarred brute, often alcoholic, student body member.

Zweig went to college for the sole purpose of earning a doctorate in any field — to satisfy his family's aspirations — not to learn; To paraphrase Ralph Waldo Emerson, "good books replace the best universities." So he decides to study philosophy to give himself as much time as possible to discover other things. Therefore, this chapter is mainly devoted to what he did outside the university during his studies.

He began by collecting his first poems and looking for a publishing house to publish them. He enjoyed some success early on, to the point that Max Reger asked him for permission to set some of his poems to music. Later, he offered one of his works to the "Neue Freie Presse" — the cultural pages of reference in Austria-Hungary at that time — and had the honor of being published at only 19 years old. Finally, he meets Theodor Herzl, for whom he nourishes a deep admiration. Of Jewish origin, like him, Herzl, who attended the public impeachment of Dreyfus had published a text promoting the creation of a Jewish state in Palestine; the text was the object of intense criticism in Western Europe but was relatively well received in Eastern Europe.

He decides to continue his studies in Berlin to change the atmosphere, escape his young celebrity, and meet people beyond the circle of the Jewish bourgeoisie in Vienna. Berlin began to attract and seek new talent, embracing novelty. He meets people from all walks of life, including the poet Peter Hille and anthroposophy's founder Rudolf Steiner. He decides to translate poems and literary texts into his mother tongue to perfect his German.

Émile Verhaeren is the subject of a long digression. Zweig recounts his first meeting while visiting the studio of Charles van der Stappen. After speaking at length with him, he decides to make his work known by translating it, a task he observes as a duty and an opportunity to refine his literary talents.

After these many rich encounters, he presented his thesis in philosophy.

Paris, the city of eternal youth 
After finishing his studies, Zweig decides to go to Paris to discover the city. Zweig launches into a lengthy description of the Parisian atmosphere, of the state of mind of Parisians. Paris represents the city where people of all classes, from all walks of life, come together on an equal footing, the city where good humor and joviality reign.

He discovers the city through his friendships, especially with Léon Bazalgette, to whom he becomes as close as a brother. He admires Bazalgette's sense of service, magnanimity, and simplicity. However, Rilke undoubtedly impressed him the most, by the aura he radiated and for whom he had tremendous respect. Zweig recounts several anecdotes about him, taking it upon himself to paint a portrait of a young man — or somewhat of a genius — compassionate, reserved, refined, and striving to remain discreet and temperate.

His meeting with Auguste Rodin also deeply marks him. He says he received a great lesson in life: the great of this world are the best. He could then understand that creative genius requires total concentration, like Rodin. Rodin gives him a tour of his studio and his last still unfinished creation, then begins to retouch his creation in his presence, and ends up forgetting Zweig's presence altogether.

Zweig then leaves Paris for London to improve his spoken English. Unfortunately, before leaving for London, he has the misfortune of having his suitcase stolen; the thief is quickly found and arrested. Having pity and a certain sympathy for the thief, Zweig decides not to file a complaint, thus earning for himself the whole neighborhood's antipathy, leading to his leaving rather quickly.

Unfortunately, in London, he does not have the opportunity to meet many people and discover the city. He does, however, attend the very well-organized private reading of poems by William Butler Yeats. He also takes away, on the advice of his friend Archibald GB Russell, a portrait of "King John" by William Blake, which he never tired of admiring.

Bypaths on the way to myself 

Zweig remembers his many travels and says that he has tried never to settle permanently in one place. If he considered this way of doing things as a mistake during his life, with hindsight, he recognizes that it allowed him to let go more quickly and accept losses without difficulty. Therefore, his furniture was reduced to what was necessary, without luxury. The only valuables he carries with him are autographs and other writings from authors he admires.

Zweig nurtures an almost religious devotion to the writings that preceded great artists' masterpieces, notably Johann Wolfgang von Goethe. His obsession is such that he boasts of having been able to meet Goethe's niece — on whom Goethe's gaze has lovingly rested.

He shares his participation in the Insel publishing house, whose deep respect and passion for works he admires. With this publishing house, he published his first dramas, notably Thersites. Zweig then recounts the strange twist of fate that has fallen on him and his creations. Four times, the performances that could have quickly propelled him to glory were stopped by the star actor or director's death. Zweig initially thought he was being chased by fate, but he recognizes afterward that it was only the fruit of chance and that, very often, chance takes on the appearance of destiny. The title of the chapter then takes on its meaning: it was by chance that he did not enter the golden books of literature for his talents as writers in versified dramas — things he would have liked — but for his novels. The detours of his life finally brought him back to his first vocation, that of a writer.

Beyond Europe 

In retrospect, Zweig recognizes the men who brought him back to reality as more critical to his life than those who turned it away for literature. This is particularly the case with Walther Rathenau, whom he deeply admires. He considers him one of the most innovative, most open, and polymath individuals. However, unfortunately, Rathenau only lacked a foundation, a global coherence he acquired when he had to save the German state — following the German defeat — with the ultimate aim of saving Europe.

He has a bad memory of India because he saw the evils of discrimination in the Indian caste system at work. However, through the meetings he has made, he says he has learned a lot; this trip helped to take a step back to appreciate Europe better. He meets Karl Haushofer, whom he regards with high esteem during his journey, although he is saddened by the recovery of his ideas by the Nazi regime.

He then traveled to the United States, which left him with a powerful impression, even though many of the characteristics that made America what it is today had not yet emerged. He is pleased to see how easy it is for any individual to find work and make a living without asking for his origin, papers, or anything else. As he walks the streets, displaying one of his books in a bookstore takes away his abandonment feeling. He ended his trip to America by contemplating the Panama Canal's technical prowess: a titanic project, costly — especially in human lives — started by the Europeans and completed by the Americans.

Light and shadows over Europe 

Zweig understands that it can be difficult for a generation to live through crises and catastrophes to conceive previous generations' optimism. They witnessed a rapid improvement in living conditions, a series of discoveries and innovations, and the liberation of mores and youth. Progress in transport had upset the maps; the air's conquest had questioned the meaning of borders. Widespread optimism gave everyone ever-growing confidence, as it thwarted any attempt to seek peace — each believing that the other side valued peace more than anything else.

The artists and the new youth were devoted to the European cause and peace between nations, but no one took the gradually emerging threats seriously. Instead, all were content to remain in a generalized idealism.

Zweig strives to restore the prevailing atmosphere by recounting small events. The Redl affair represents the first event in which tensions were palpable. The next day, he ran into Bertha von Suttner, who foretold the turn of events:

When he went to the cinema in the small town of Tours, he was amazed to see that the hatred — displayed against Kaiser Wilhelm II — had already spread throughout France. However, he left despite everything, confident in Vienna, already considering what he intended to achieve in the coming months. Everyone collapses after the Sarajevo bombing.

The first hours of the war of 1914 
Notable episodes include the Austrian public's reaction to the assassination of Archduke Franz Ferdinand and his wife in Sarajevo in 1914, the departure from Austria by a train of the last Emperor Charles I of Austria in 1918, the beginning of the Salzburg festival and the Austrian hyperinflation of 1921–22.

According to Zweig, the summer of 1914 would have been unforgettable in its sweetness and beauty. The news of the death of Franz Ferdinand of Austria, although it hurt those who had just learned about it at the time, did not leave lasting traces. Franz Ferdinand was hardly appreciated, and Zweig himself found him cold, distant, unfriendly. The most controversial was his funeral: he had entered into a misalliance, and it was unacceptable that his wife and children could rest with the rest of the Hapsburgs.

The world never imagined that a war could break out. Zweig had visited a few days before declaring war with friends in Belgium. Even seeing the Belgian soldiers, Zweig was convinced that Belgium would not be attacked. Then ominous events multiplied until the outbreak of war with the declaration of war by Austria against Serbia.

The young soldiers went cheerfully to the front, to the crowd's cheers. National solidarity and brotherhood were at their peak. Compared to the abatement of 1939, this enthusiasm for war is explained by an idealization of war, possible by its great temporal distance, the heightened optimism of the century, and the almost blind confidence in governments' honesty. This enthusiasm quickly turned into a deep hatred towards the enemies of the fatherland.

Zweig does not participate in this widespread hatred, as he knows the now rival nations too well to hate them overnight. \Physically unfit to go to the front, he committed his forces to work as a librarian within the military archives. He sees his whole country sinking in the apology of the opposing camp's deep and sincere hatred, like the poet Ernst Lissauer, author of the Song of hatred against England. Zweig, rejected by his friends who consider him almost a traitor to his nation, for his part, undertakes a personal war against this murderous passion.

The Struggle for Intellectual Brotherhood 
Zweig makes it his mission, rather than only not taking part in this hatred, to actively fight against this propaganda, less to convince than to spread his message simply. He succeeded in having an article published in the "Berliner Tageblatt," urging them to remain faithful to friendships beyond borders. Shortly after, he receives a letter from his friend Romain Rolland, and the two decide to promote reconciliation. They tried to organize a conference bringing together the great thinkers of all nations to encourage mutual understanding. They continued their commitment through their writings, comforting those in despair in this dark time.

Zweig then took the opportunity to observe the ravages of war with his own eyes on the Russian front. He sees the dramatic situation in which the soldiers find themselves; he considers the solidarity formed between the soldiers of the two camps who feel powerless in the face of the events they are going through. He is initially shocked to see that officers far from the front can walk almost carefree with young ladies several hours by train from the front. However, very quickly, he forgives them because the real culprits are those who, in his eyes, encourage the feeling of hatred towards the "enemy."

He decides to fight this propaganda by writing a drama, emphasizing Biblical themes, particularly Jewish wanderings and trials, praising the losers' destiny. He produced this work to free himself from society's censorship imposed on him.

In the heart of Europe 
He expected poor reception when published his drama "Jérémie" in October 1917. However, to his surprise, his work was very well received, and he was offered to conduct its representation in Zurich. Therefore, he decides to leave for Switzerland, a rare neutral country in Europe's heart. He met two Austrians in Salzburg on his journey to Switzerland who would play a significant role once Austria had surrendered: Heinrich Lammasch and Ignaz Seipel. These two pacifists had planned and convinced the Emperor of Austria to negotiate a separate peace if the Germans refused to make peace.

When Zweig crosses the border, he is immediately relieved, and he feels relieved of a burden, happy to enter a country at peace. Once in Switzerland, he is pleased to find his friend Rolland and other French acquaintances and feels fraternally united. During his stay, it was the figure of the director of the anti-militarist newspaper Demain, Henri Guilbeaux who marked him deeply because it was in him that he saw a historical law being verified: in intense periods, simple men could exceptionally become central figures of a current — here, that of the anti-militarists during the First World War. Moreover, he has the opportunity to see many refugees who could not choose their camps, torn by war at the James Joyce.

After the relative success of his play, he gradually realizes that Switzerland is not only a land of refuge but the theater of a game of espionage and counter-espionage. During his stay, the German and Austrian defeat becomes more and more inevitable, and the world begins to rejoice in the chorus of a finally better and more human world.

Homecoming to Austria 
Once the German and Austrian defeat has been confirmed, Zweig decides to join his country in ruins, driven by a patriotic impulse: he gives himself the mission of helping his country accept its defeat. His return is the subject of a long preparation since winter is approaching, and the country is now in the greatest need. On his return, he attends the last Austrian Emperor's departure in the station, a milestone for an Austrian for whom the Emperor was the central Austrian figure.

Then begins the bitter observation of a generalized regression of life; everything of value has been stolen, such as leather, copper, and nickel. The trains are in such bad condition that the journey times are considerably extended. Once at home in Salzburg, in residence he bought during the war, he must face everyday life made difficult by shortages and cold — when his roof is ripped through and repairs made impossible by the scarcity. He watches helplessly the devaluation of the Austrian crown and inflation, the loss of quality of all products, paradoxical situations, the invasion of foreigners who profit from the depreciation of the Austrian currency, etc.

Paradoxically, theaters, concerts, and operas are active, and artistic and cultural life is in full swing: Zweig explains this by the general feeling that this could be the last performance. Also, the young generation rebels against the old authority and rejects everything at once: homosexuality becomes a sign of protest, young writers think outside the box, and painters abandon classicism for cubism and surrealism. Meanwhile, Zweig set himself the task of reconciling the European nations by taking care of the German side. First alongside Henri Barbusse, then alone on his side, after the communist radicalization of Barbusse's newspaper, Clarté.

Into the world again 
After surviving the three years after the war in Salzburg, Austria, he decided to travel with his wife to Italy once the situation improved sufficiently. Full of apprehension about the reception we reserve for an Austrian, he is surprised by the Italians' hospitality and thoughtfulness, telling himself that the masses had not changed profoundly because of the propaganda. He met his poet friend Giuseppe Antonio Borgese and his painter friend Alberto Stringa. Zweig admits to being, at that moment, still lulled by the illusion that the war is over, although he has the opportunity to hear young Italians singing Giovinezza.

He then goes to Germany. He has time to see his friend Rathenau, who is now Minister of Foreign Affairs, for the last time. He admires this man who knows fully that only time can heal the wounds left by war. After the assassination of Rathenau, Germany sank into hyperinflation, debauchery, and disorder. According to Zweig, this sad episode was decisive for the rise of the Nazi Party.

Zweig has the chance to experience unexpected success and to be translated into several languages. He reads a lot and hardly appreciates redundancies, heavy styles, etc., preferences that are found in his style: he says he writes in a fluid manner, such as the words come to mind. Zweig says he has carried out important synthesis work — notably with Marie-Antoinette — and sees his capacity for conciseness as a defining element of his success. He knows the pleasure of seeing Maxim Gorky, whom he already admired at school, write the preface to one of his works.

While he recognizes that this success fills him with joy when he touches his works and works, he refuses to be the object of admiration for his appearance. He naively enjoys his fame at first on his travels, but it weighs on him. So he wishes he had started to write and publish under a pseudonym to enjoy his celebrity in all serenity.

Sunset 
Zweig says that before Hitler came to power, people had never traveled so much in Europe. He continues to travel at this time, particularly about his career and fame as a writer. However, despite his success, Zweig says he remains humble and does not change his habits: he continues to stroll with his friends in the streets, and he does not disdain going to the provinces to stay in small hotels.

If there is one trip that taught him a lot, it is the one to Russia. Russia had always been on his list, but he still did his best to remain politically neutral. Finally, he has the opportunity to officially go to Russia in an unbiased way: on the birthday of Leo Tolstoy, a great Russian writer. At first, fascinated by the authenticity of the inhabitants, their friendliness, and their warm welcome, by the profound simplicity of Tolstoy's tomb, he left with great caution. Following one of the parties, he realizes that someone has slipped him a letter in French, warning him of the propaganda of the Soviet regime. He begins to reflect on the intellectual stimulation that exile can promote.

Later, he had the opportunity to use his celebrity to ask a favor of Benito Mussolini, to spare the life of Giuseppe Germani. His wife had begged the writer to intervene, to put pressure on Mussolini by organizing an international protest. Instead, Zweig preferred to send a letter personally to Duce, and Mussolini granted his request.

Back in Salzburg, he was impressed by the cultural scope that the city had taken, which had become the artistic center of Europe. It thus has the opportunity to welcome the great names of literature and painting. Seeing these artists and writers allows him to complete his autographs and first drafts collection. Zweig looks back on this passion of which he boasts of his expertise and admits to seeking, above all, the secrets of the creation of masterpieces. However, unfortunately, with Hitler's rise to power, his collection gradually fell apart.

Before these tragic events, Zweig reveals to have wondered about his success, a success he had not ardently desired. A thought crossed him at this time, after having acquired a secure, enviable and — he believed — lasting position: Wäre es nicht besser für mich — so träumte es in mir weiter — etwas anderes käme, etwas Neues, etwas das mich unruhiger, gespannter, das mich jünger machte, indem es mich herausforderte zu neuem und vielleicht noch gefährlicherem Kampf?— Zweig, Sonnenuntergang, Die Welt von Gestern (1942)"Wouldn't it be better for me — so that thought continued within me — if something else happened, something new, something that troubles me, torments me, rejuvenates me, demanding of me a new and perhaps more dangerous fight?"His rash wish, resulting from a "volatile thought" — in his words — came true, shattering everything, him, and what he had accomplished.

Incipit Hitler 
Zweig begins by stating a law: no witness to significant changes can recognize them at their beginnings. Even after his failed coup, Hitler was merely one agitator among many in this period shaken by coup attempts, and his name quickly faded into insignificance. However, organized gangs of young men in Nazi insignia were starting to cause trouble. It was unthinkable when Germany imagined that a man as uneducated as Hitler could come to power. However, he succeeded by promising everything to all parties; everyone thought they could use him.

Zweig admits that as a young man, he had not recognized the coming danger of the Nazis, who started organizing and agitating in Austria in the 1920s. Zweig was a committed pacifist but hated politics and shunned political engagement. He shows some reluctance to analyze Nazism as a political ideology; he regards it as the rule of one particularly evil man, Hitler. Nevertheless, Zweig was struck that the Berghof, Hitler's mountain residence in Berchtesgaden, an area of early Nazi activity, was just across the valley from his own house outside Salzburg. Zweig believed strongly in Europeanism against nationalism.

Zweig had told his publisher that his books would be banned as soon as the Reichstag was burnt down — something he had not believed possible. He then describes the progressive censorship that descended on his opera Die schweigsame Frau, even as he witnessed the artistic power of his co-worker, the composer Richard Strauss. Due to Zweig's politically neutral writings and Strauss' unrivaled fame in Germany, it was impossible to censor the opera. After reading Zweig's libretto, Hitler himself exceptionally authorized the performance and attended it in person. However, after the Gestapo intercepted a letter from Strauss about his principles as President of the Reich Music Chamber, the opera was censored, and Strauss was forced to give up his position.

During these first troubles, Zweig went to France, then to England, where he undertook the biography of Marie Stuart, noting the need for an objective and accurate work. Once completed, he returned to Salzburg, where he realized the critical situation of his country: even with shootings breaking out daily in the streets, foreign newspapers were better informed than he was about the Austrian situation. He chooses to flee to London when the police forcibly search his residence, a previously unthinkable violation of civil liberties.

The agony of peace 
Zweig sets the tone for the last chapter with a quote from Shakespeare:

Like Gorky, Zweig's exile was not yet "real": he still had his passport to return home at any time. After the Munich peace agreement, Zweig suspected that negotiation with Hitler was pointless, as he would break every commitment at the right time. However, Zweig remained silent, knowing he could not influence England, having failed even in his own country.

During his stay, he attended a memorable debate between HG Wells and Bernard Shaw, of whom he gives a long and admiring description. He also saw his friend Sigmund Freud, who had managed to reach England. Delighted to speak with Freud one last time, an admirable scholar devoted to the cause of truth, Zweig attended his funeral shortly after. As Zweig prepared for his new marriage, Hitler declared war on Poland, making him an "enemy national," and the exile prepared his affairs to travel to an even further country. 

At a PEN-Club conference, he stopped in Vigo, Spain, then in the hands of General Franco, noting again with bitterness the young people swaggering in fascist uniforms. However, after moving to Argentina and seeing the Hispanic heritage still intact, he regained hope. He praises Brazil, his last host country, a land of immigrants looking to the future, and says he sees Europe's future.

He looks back to Austria's annexation. His friends had firmly believed that the neighboring countries would never accept such an event, but Zweig had already, in autumn 1937, said goodbye to his mother and the rest of his family. He then watched as his family and nation were lost to Nazi barbarism.

Zweig then develops an extended meditation on the tribulations that pursue all the Jews, despite the great cultural and religious variety of those designated as such. He ends his work by admitting to being defeated by hatred, even by its shadow, but with this consolation:

Intellectual life 
The World of Yesterday details Zweig's career before, during, and after World War I. Of particular interest are Zweig's description of various intellectual personalities, including Theodor Herzl, the founder of modern political Zionism, Rainer Maria Rilke, the Belgian poet Emile Verhaeren, the composer Ferruccio Busoni, the philosopher and antifascist Benedetto Croce, Maxim Gorky, Hugo von Hofmannsthal, Arthur Schnitzler, Franz Werfel, Gerhart Hauptmann, James Joyce, Nobel Peace Prize laureate Bertha von Suttner, the German industrialist and politician Walther Rathenau and the pacifist and friend Romain Rolland. 

Zweig also met Karl Haushofer during a trip to India. The two became friends. Haushofer was the founder of geopolitics and later became an influence on Adolf Hitler. Zweig was always aloof from politics and overlooked the dark potential of Haushofer's thoughts; he was surprised when later told of links between Hitler and Haushofer.

Zweig particularly admired the poetry of Hugo von Hofmannsthal and expressed this admiration and Hofmannsthal's influence on his generation in the chapter devoted to his school years:
Zweig also describes his passion for collecting manuscripts, primarily literary and musical.

Zweig collaborated in the early 1930s with composer Richard Strauss on the opera Die schweigsame Frau, which is based on a libretto by Zweig. Strauss was then admired by the Nazis, who were not happy that their favorite composer's new opera had a Jewish author's libretto. Zweig recounts that Strauss refused to withdraw the opera and even insisted that Zweig's authorship of the libretto be credited; the first performance in Dresden was said to have been authorized by Hitler himself. Zweig thought it prudent not to be present. The run was interrupted after the second performance, as the Gestapo had intercepted a private letter from Strauss to Zweig. The elderly composer invited Zweig to write the libretto for another opera. According to Zweig, this led to Strauss's resignation as president of the Reichsmusikkammer, the Nazi state institute for music.

Nothing is said of Zweig's first wife and his second marriage is barely mentioned. The tragic effects of contemporary antisemitism are discussed, but Zweig does not analyze in detail his Jewish identity. Zweig's friendship with Sigmund Freud is described towards the end, mainly while both lived in London during the last year of Freud's life.

Adaptations 
 2016 : Le monde d'hier by Laurent Seksik , directed by Patrick Pineau and Jérôme Kircher at the Théâtre de Mathurins in Paris.

References

External links
 

1942 non-fiction books
Austrian books
Literary autobiographies
Viking Press books
Works by Stefan Zweig
Works about Austria-Hungary